Harry Boye Karlsen (14 March 1920 – 8 January 1994) was a Norwegian international footballer. He was born in Horten, and played 58 games for Norway, scoring four goals, between 1946 and 1956. He was a member of the Norwegian squad that competed at the 1952 Olympics. Karlsen played as a defender or as a wing-half (defensive midfield), and was used as a free kick and penalty taker.

During World War II Karlsen played for several British teams. He joined Dundee United in September 1943, playing regularly for them until being posted to England in January 1945. He returned to make a few more appearances later in the year, and also played a single match for Exeter City in October 1945.  After the war he joined Lyn and won the Norwegian cup with them in 1946. He moved back to Horten the following year, rejoining his hometown club Ørn, where he also played before the war. In 1952 he transferred to Larvik Turn where he was also player-coach. At Larvik Turn, Karlsen won the Norwegian Premier League in 1952/53, 1954/55 and 1955/56.

References

External links

1920 births
1994 deaths
People from Horten
Norwegian footballers
Norway international footballers
Larvik Turn players
Lyn Fotball players
FK Ørn-Horten players
Dundee United F.C. wartime guest players
Exeter City F.C. wartime guest players
Norwegian expatriates in England
Norwegian expatriates in Scotland
Olympic footballers of Norway
Footballers at the 1952 Summer Olympics
Association football defenders
Sportspeople from Vestfold og Telemark